Kravkov is a Russian masculine surname, its feminine counterpart is Kravkova. It may refer to
Maximilian Kravkov (1887–1937), Russian writer and geologist
Nikolai Kravkov (1865–1924), Russian pharmacologist
Sergey Kravkov (disambiguation), several people
Vasily Kravkov (1859–1920), Russian military doctor, brother of Nikolai

Russian-language surnames